Cristiana Checchi (born 8 July 1977) is an Italian shot putter.

Biography
She finished seventh at the 2002 European Indoor Championships, fourteenth at the 2002 European Championships and eleventh at the 2006 European Championships. She also competed at the World Indoor Championships in 2003 and 2004 and the 2005 World Championships without reaching the final round.

Her personal best throw is 18.59 metres, achieved when she won the 2005 Mediterranean Games in Almería. She has 18.64 metres on the indoor track, achieved in February 2003 in Schio. She also has 59.74 metres in the discus throw, achieved in June 2007 in Milan. She failed a doping test in 2003. She has also competed internationally in the bobsleigh.

See also
Italian all-time lists - Shot put
Italian all-time lists - Discus throw

References

External links
 

1977 births
Living people
Italian female shot putters
Italian female discus throwers
Doping cases in athletics
Italian sportspeople in doping cases
Italian female bobsledders
Mediterranean Games gold medalists for Italy
Athletes (track and field) at the 2005 Mediterranean Games
Mediterranean Games medalists in athletics
20th-century Italian women
21st-century Italian women